Round Island is an uninhabited island in the Qikiqtaaluk Region of Nunavut, Canada. It is located across the mouth of Coutts Inlet in Baffin Bay off the northeastern coast of Baffin Island.

Another, smaller Nunavut Round Island is located in Cross Bay, at the land end of Chesterfield Inlet.

References

External links 
 Round Island (Nunavut) in the Atlas of Canada - Toporama; Natural Resources Canada
 Round Island (Nunavut) (Chesterfield Inlet) in the Atlas of Canada - Toporama; Natural Resources Canada

Islands of Baffin Island
Islands of Baffin Bay
Uninhabited islands of Qikiqtaaluk Region